Herff–Rozelle Farm is located in Boerne, in the county of Kendall, in the U.S. state of Texas. It was added to the National Register of Historic Places listings in Kendall County on December 3, 2009. It was built by Ferdinand Ludwig Herff in 1855.  The property was sold to George and Erma Rozelle in 1935. It is managed by the Cibolo Nature Center.

Photo gallery

See also

National Register of Historic Places listings in Kendall County, Texas

References

External links

The Herff Farm

Buildings and structures in Kendall County, Texas
Historic districts on the National Register of Historic Places in Texas
Farms on the National Register of Historic Places in Texas
National Register of Historic Places in Kendall County, Texas